The following is a timeline of the history of the city of Norwich, Norfolk, England.

Prior to 12th century

 924 AD – Market active.
 1004 – Norwich sacked by Danes.
 1067 – Norwich Castle construction begins (approximate date).
 1094 – Seat of East Anglian bishopric relocated to Norwich from Thetford.
 1096 – Norwich School established.

12th–13th centuries
 1100 – Bishop's Palace built (approximate date).
 1101 – Norwich Cathedral dedicated.
 1106 – Norwich fair active.
 1100 – St. Leonard's priory built on Mousehold Heath.
 1122 – King Henry I visits town.
 1144 – A young apprentice, William of Norwich, is murdered.
 1145 – Norwich Cathedral completed.
 1158 - Henry II. grants the burgesses a charter.
 1190 - Antisemitic massacre
 1194 - Richard I. grants them a fuller charter.
 1216 – Dauphin Louis takes Norwich Castle.
 1248 – Chapel and Hospice of St Mary's in the Field founded.
 1249 – St. Giles's Hospital founded.
 1266 – "Disinherited Barons sack city."
 1272 – Norwich riot.
 1295 – Bishops Bridge built.
 1298 - Norwich represented in parliament by two members.

14th–15th centuries

 1341 – Norwich Market ceded to city.
 1342 – City walls built.
 1348 – Plague/ Black Death.
 1383 – Queen Anne of Bohemia visits Norwich.
 1384 – Cloth Seld established.
 1385 – Guild of Saint George founded (approximate date).
 1404 – Norwich incorporated.
 1411 – Market Cross built.
 1413 – Norwich Guildhall built.
 1414 – Fire.
 1430 – Great Hall built.
 1443 – Gladman's insurrection.
 1455 – St Peter Mancroft church consecrated.
 1472 – St Laurence's Church built.

16th century
 1505 – Fire.
 1510 – Church of St John Maddermarket rebuilt.
 1521 – Coslany bridge rebuilt.
 1543 – Hatters company formed.
 1549 – Kett's Rebellion.
 1554 – Russell company of weavers founded.
 1558 – Cunninghams map of city created.
1565 - Walloons arrive in Norwich and French Church established.
 1567 – Anthony de Solempne sets up printing press.
 1573 – Fye bridge rebuilt.
 1578 – Queen Elizabeth I visits city.
 1586 – Blackfriars Bridge rebuilt.
 1591 – Whitefriars Bridge rebuilt

17th century
 1602 – Plague/Black Death.
 1608 – Norwich Public Library established.
 1615 – Peter Gleane becomes mayor.
 1621 – George Birch becomes mayor.
 1652 – William Barnham becomes mayor.
 1663 – William Oliver bookseller in business.
 1671 – King Charles II visits City
 1675 – George Rose bookseller in business.
 1687 – Doughty's Hospital established.
  – St Augustine's Church tower rebuilt.
 1693 – Population: 28,881.
 1697 – New Mint established.

18th century
 1701 – Norwich Post newspaper begins publication.
 1727 – Norwich Mercury newspaper begins publication.
 1731 – White Swan Playhouse active (approximate date).
 1754 – Assembly House built.
 1756 – Octagon Chapel built.
 1757 – Theatre built.
 1761 – Norfolk Chronicle newspaper begins publication.
 1762 – Hills and Underwood distillery in business.
 1763 – Richard Beatniffe bookseller in business.
 1770 – Gurney's Bank established.
 1771 – Norfolk and Norwich Hospital founded.
 1784 – Norfolk and Norwich Subscription Library established.
 1785 – William Stevenson bookseller in business.
 1786 – Norfolk And Norwich Benevolent Medical Society founded.
 1792 – Hudson & Harvey bank established.
 1800 – Fish's Musical Circulating Library in business.

19th century
 1803 – Norwich Society of Artists active.
 1811 – Foundry Bridge constructed.
 1819 – Rosary Cemetery established.
 1820 – Steward, Patterson & Stewards brewery in business.
 1821 – Population: 50,288.
 1822
 Norfolk and Norwich Literary Institution established.
 Duke's Palace Bridge built.
 1823
 J. & J. Colman in business.
 Jarrolds relocates to Norwich.
 1824
 Norfolk and Norwich Festival begins.
 Norfolk and Norwich Museum, and Norfolk and Norwich United Medical Book Society established.
 1826 – Theatre rebuilt.
 1829
 City gaol built.
 Norfolk and Norwich Horticultural Society established.
 1831 – Canal and harbour open.
 1833
 Norwich Yarn Company in business.
 Carrow Bridge rebuilt.
 1835 – Town Council elected per Municipal Corporations Act 1835.
 1837 – Bullard & Watts brewery in business.
 1839 – St James Mill built.
 1844 – Yarmouth-Norwich railway begins operating.
 1845
 Norfolk News begins publication.
 Norfolk and Norwich Archaeological Society established.
 1847 – Chamber of Commerce established.
 1849 – Norwich Victoria railway station opens.
 1851 – Board of Health established.
 1856 – Young Men's Christian Association chapter established.
 1857
 Free Library building opens.
 Norfolk and Norwich Anglers' Society formed.
 1861 – Population: 75,025.
 1866 – Chapel Field Road drill hall opened.
 1869 – Norfolk and Norwich Naturalists' Society founded.
 1874 – 10 September: Thorpe rail accident occurs near town.
 1875 – Norwich High School for Girls founded.
 1878 – Harry Bullard becomes mayor.
 1880 – Chapelfield Gardens open.
 1882 – Norwich City railway station opens.
 1887 – HM Prison Norwich established.
 1888 – Norfolk and Norwich Photographic Society established.
 1891 – City College Norwich founded.
 1897
 Labour strike.
 Royal Hotel in business.
 1900 – Norwich Electric Tramways begin operating.

20th century

 1901 – Population: 111,733.
 1902 – Norwich City Football Club founded, inheriting the song "On the Ball, City".
 1903 – Grand Opera House opens.
 1909 – Sewell Park opens.
 1910 – St John the Baptist Roman Catholic Church, Norwich built Now Roman Catholic Cathedral
 1911 – Picture House (cinema) opens.
 1921 – Maddermarket Theatre founded.
 1923 – First lady Lord Mayor.
 1924 – Heigham Park opens.
 1925 - 2345 percent off the market destroyed 
 Wensum Park laid out.
 The Ferry Boat Inn in business.
 1928 – Eaton Park opens.
 1929 – Sloughbottom Park and Mile Cross Gardens open.
 1933 – Waterloo Park opens.
 1938 – City Hall built.
 1942 – April: Aerial bombing by German forces.
 1963 – University of East Anglia established.
 1973 – Colman's Mustard Shop opens.
 1974 – Norfolk Tower built.
 1976 – Norwich Buddhist Centre established.
 1977 – Norwich Arts Centre opens.
 1978 – Sainsbury Centre for Visual Arts and Norwich Cinema City open.
 1979 – Norwich Puppet Theatre founded.
 1980 – Sewell Barn Theatre opens.
 1982 – City of Norwich Aviation Museum active (approximate date).
 1988 – Norwich Airport terminal opens.
 1992 – Norwich Research Park launched.
 1995 – Norwich Playhouse opens.

21st century

 2001
 Norfolk and Norwich University Hospital founded.
 The Forum built.
 2004 – Norwich HEART heritage organisation established.
 2005 – Delia Smith made her iconic "Let's be 'avin' you!" speech at Carrow Road. 
 2006 – 99.9 Radio Norwich begins broadcasting.
 2007 – Theatre Royal building refurbished.
 2009 – Norwich Film Festival begins.
 2018 – Colman's announces transfer of most of its mustard production away from Norwich in 
2018-2019
 2020 - Covid 19 pandemic happens

See also
 History of Norwich
 History of Norfolk

References

Further reading

Published in the 17th–18th centuries 
 
 
  (Defoe visited circa 1723)

Published in the 19th century

1800s–1840s 
 
 
 
 
 
 
 
 
 
 
 
 
 
  (includes Norwich)

1850s–1890s 
 
  (describes Norwich)
 
 
 
 
 
 
 
 1865 ed.
 1875 ed.
 1883 ed.

Published in the 20th century 
 
 
 
 
 
 
 E. A. Kent, The Mayors of Norwich, 1403 to 1835 (Norwich, 1938)

Published in the 21st century 
 Carole Rawcliffe and Richard Wilson, eds., Norwich since 1550: a fine city (London: Hambledon and London, 2004)

External links

 
 Digital Public Library of America. Works related to Norwich, various dates

Years in England
 
Norwich-related lists
Norwich
Norwich